The 2020 FC Caspiy season is Caspiy's the first season back in the Kazakhstan Premier League, the highest tier of association football in Kazakhstan, since 2001. Caspiy will also take part in the Kazakhstan Cup.

Season events
On 13 March, the Football Federation of Kazakhstan announced all league fixtures would be played behind closed doors for the foreseeable future due to the COVID-19 pandemic. On 16 March the Football Federation of Kazakhstan suspended all football until 15 April.

On 26 June, it was announced that the league would resume on 1 July, with no fans being permitted to watch the games. The league was suspended for a second time on 3 July, for an initial two weeks, due to an increase in COVID-19 cases in the country.

On 23 July, Sultan Sagnayev and Ramazan Karimov had their season-long loan deals ended prematurely and they returned to Astana.

Squad

Transfers

Winter

In:

Out:

Summer

In:

Out:

Released

Competitions

Premier League

Results summary

Results by round

Results

League table

Kazakhstan Cup

Squad statistics

Appearances and goals

|-
|colspan="14"|Players away from Caspiy on loan:
|-
|colspan="14"|Players who left Caspiy during the season:

|}

Goal scorers

Clean sheet

Disciplinary record

References

FC Caspiy seasons
Caspiy